Francisco Rodríguez Pascual (20 March 1927 – 22 April 2007) was a Spanish humanist and anthropologist.  He was considered a pioneer in the field of ethnography. His most well known work is the critically acclaimed "Dios Nuestro Señor"

1927 births
2007 deaths
People from the Province of Zamora
Spanish humanists
Spanish ethnographers
20th-century Spanish Roman Catholic priests